Europe first participated in the Little League World Series in .  Teams from Europe were given a berth in the LLWS each year between 1960 and 2000 (with the exception of the temporary ban of international teams in ). In 2001, the region was split into two co-terminus regions: Europe (later EMEA) Region and Transatlantic Region.  The Europe Region comprised mostly native European teams while the Transatlantic Region comprised mostly American expatriates.  This distinction was eliminated in 2008; from 2008 to 2012, teams made up of either native Europeans or American expatriates were eligible to qualify from the Europe Region.

Starting with the 2013 LLWS, the region was renamed the Europe and Africa Region. African countries were added as a result of a major reorganization of the international (non–U.S.) regions. This move was triggered by Little League's announcement that Australia would receive its own LLWS berth starting in 2013. Two Middle Eastern countries, Israel and Turkey, have been part of European regions since they instituted Little League programs, as they were then members of the European zone of the International Baseball Federation and remain in the same zone under baseball's modern international governing body, the World Baseball Softball Confederation. Israel and Turkey have stayed in the renamed Europe and Africa Region to this day.

No team from the European region has ever reached the final of the Little League World Series. Aviano, Italy, made it that far — in the 8-team format — in 1979. Kaiserslautern, Germany and Dhahran, Saudi Arabia made the International final in back-to-back years in 1993 and 1994.

Europe and Africa Region Countries

United Kingdom

European champions (1960–2000)

Europe/Europe, Middle East & Africa Region (2001–2007)

In 2001, with the LLWS expanding to sixteen teams, the European region split into two co-terminous regions.  The Europe region consisted of teams that were primarily made up of players native to each country; no team could have more than three players from the United States, Canada, or Japan.  The Europe region was named the Europe, Middle East, and Africa (EMEA) region between 2004 and 2007; however, no Middle Eastern or African team participated in qualifiers for the EMEA Series berth (although Kenya sent a team to the European qualifier in 2001 and South Africa did the same in 2003).  In 2008, Little League removed the native players rule and split the EMEA and Transatlantic region into the Europe and Middle East-Africa regions.  The following teams represented the European region after 2000:

Transatlantic Region (2001–2007)

The Transatlantic region encompassed the same territory as the Europe/EMEA region, but consisted of teams that were made up of at least 51% American, Canadian, or Japanese citizens.

Regional championship

Below are the champions of the Transatlantic region, along with participants for each year.  The year's winner is indicated in green.

LLWS performance

Europe Region (2008–2012)

From 2008 to 2012, Europe had its own region.

Regional Championships

Below are the champions of the Europe region, along with participants for each year.  The year's winner is indicated in green.
A Dash, "-", indicates country had no participant that year.

LLWS Performance

Europe and Africa Region (2013–)
As noted above, the Europe Region was expanded to include Africa in 2013. Results are as of the 2017 Little League World Series.

Europe-Africa Qualifier
Starting in 2018, a qualification tournament was added into the Europe and Africa regional tournament as a way of expanding for other countries and teams to be involved. Ten teams have an automatic bid into the regional tournament based on participation and enrollment figures. Additional countries wishing to enter the tournament are placed into the qualifier tournament. The format of the qualifier tournament is a round robin with four teams advancing to an elimination round where the two semifinal winners advanced to the double-elimination regional tournament.

Regional Championships

Below are the champions of the Europe and Africa, along with participants for each year.  The year's winner is indicated in green.
A Dash, "-", indicates country had no participant that year.

LLWS Performance
{|class="wikitable"
!Year!!Champion!!City!!LLWS!!Record
|-
|||South Moravia LL|| Brno||Round 1||1–2
|-
|||South Moravia LL|| Brno||Round 1||0–3
|-
|||AVRS Secondary School LL|| Kampala||Round 2||1–2
|-
|||Emilia LL|| Emilia||Round 1||0–3
|- 
|||Emilia LL|| Emilia||Round 1||0–3
|-
|||Catalunya LL|| Barcelona||Round 1||0–3
|-
|||Emilia Romagna LL|| Bologna||Round 1||0–3
|-
|2020|| align=center colspan=4|Cancelled due to COVID-19 crisis 
|-
||| align=center colspan=4|No participant
|-
|||Emilia Romagna LL|| Bologna||Round 2||1–2
|}

By country
Table includes results from Europe, EMEA, Transatlantic and Europe and Africa regions through the 2022 Little League World Series. Italics'' indicates team is no longer a part of European region.

See also

References

External links
 Little League homepage
Little League EMEA region

Europe
Baseball leagues in Europe
International baseball competitions in Europe